The Walsh Cavaliers are the athletic teams that represent Walsh University, located in North Canton, Ohio, in NCAA Division II intercollegiate sporting competitions. The Cavaliers compete as members of the Great Midwest Athletic Conference for all 20 of their current varsity sports. Two sports not sponsored by the G-MAC will be added in the 2023–24 school year.

Varsity teams

List of teams

Men's sports (10)
Baseball
Basketball
Cross country
Football
Golf
Lacrosse
Soccer
 Sprint football (to be added in 2023–24)
Tennis
Track and field
Bowling

Women's sports (10)
Basketball
Cross country
Golf
Lacrosse
Soccer
Softball
 STUNT (to be added in 2023–24)
Tennis
Track and field
Volleyball
Bowling

Facilities
The university's football team used to play their home games at Tom Benson Hall of Fame Stadium, however they now play their home games on campus at Larry Staut Field.

Championships
The men's basketball team won the 2005 NAIA National Championship.  
The women's basketball team won the 1998 NAIA National Championship.
The men's baseball team advanced to the 2007 NAIA World Series for the first time in school history.

References

External links